is a 1987 Japanese mystery novel,the debut work of author Yukito Ayatsuji.  Borrowing its basic plot structure from Agatha Christie's And Then There Were None (Christie's book is directly referenced by some of the characters at several points), it tells the story of a group of seven university students who travel to a deserted island that was the scene of a grisly mass murder six months earlier, where events soon turn ominous.   The Decagon House Murders belongs to the  subgenre of mystery fiction.

Locked Room International published the first English-language edition of the novel in 2015. The second English-language edition was published in December 2020 by Pushkin Press, and in July 2021 the manga adaptation, illustrated by Hiro Kiyohara, was announced for publication in America.

Plot

Seven students, members of their university's mystery club, decide to spend a week-long vacation on Tsunojima Island off the coast of Japan.  Six months earlier the owner of the island was brutally murdered alongside his wife and housekeepers, and the case remains unsolved.  Soon after their arrival they begin to suspect that one of their members is intending to kill them one at a time, but who?

Meanwhile, back on the mainland a former member of the club named Kawaminami receives a letter saying that the death of a girl who died at a club party one year earlier was murder. And the girl in question just happened to be the daughter of the slaughtered island owner.  After learning that several other people have received a similar letter, he also begins to suspect that something sinister is happening.

References

1987 Japanese novels
Japanese mystery novels
1987 debut novels
Fiction set in 1986